opened in a wooded area some  north of the centre of Utsunomiya, Tochigi Prefecture, Japan, in 1997. The collection includes works by Kuroda Seiki and Asai Chū, Paul Klee and Wassily Kandinsky, and special exhibitions are also mounted.

See also
 Tochigi Prefectural Museum
 Tochigi Prefectural Museum of Fine Arts

References

External links

 Utsunomiya Museum of Art

Museums in Tochigi Prefecture
Art museums and galleries in Japan
Utsunomiya
Art museums established in 1997
1997 establishments in Japan